Sergei Vasilievich Kuznetsov (born 1 January 1963) is a Ukrainian former professional footballer who played as a defender.

Club career
Kuznetsov made his professional debut in the Soviet First League in 1981 for Metalist Kharkiv. He played two games in the UEFA Cup 1990–91 for Chornomorets Odesa.

In 1983 Kuznetsov took part in the Summer Spartakiad of the Peoples of the USSR in the team of Ukrainian SSR.

Personal life
His son Serhiy Kuznetsov is also a former football player.

Honours
 Soviet Cup: 1987–88 (played in the early stages of the tournament for FC Metalist Kharkiv)
 USSR Federation Cup: 1990
 USSR Federation Cup finalist: 1987

References

Living people
1963 births
People from Belgorod
Russian emigrants to Ukraine
Soviet footballers
Ukrainian footballers
Association football defenders
Soviet Top League players
Russian Premier League players
FC Metalist Kharkiv players
FC Chornomorets Odesa players
FC Metalurh Zaporizhzhia players
Ferencvárosi TC footballers
FC KAMAZ Naberezhnye Chelny players
Expatriate footballers in Hungary